This is a list of public art in the London Borough of Southwark.

Bankside

Bermondsey

Camberwell

Dulwich

Elephant and Castle

Kennington

Newington

Peckham

Rotherhithe

Southwark

References

Bibliography

External links
 

Southwark
Southwark
Tourist attractions in the London Borough of Southwark